Enemigo íntimo is a Spanish-language telenovela that premiered on Telemundo on 21 February 2018 and ended on 21 September 2020. Produced by Telemundo Global Studios and Argos Comunicación and distributed by Telemundo Internacional.

The series tells the story of two siblings separated when they were small children and who were united years later. Both ignore that they have many things in common, the same parents, a happy childhood and a great crime that separated them. He has never stopped looking for her and she now she has no memories and now fate puts them face to face in a war without quarter.

On 7 May 2018, Telemundo confirmed that the show has been renewed for a second season. The production of the second season began on 9 September 2019.

Plot

Season 1 (2018) 

The season follows the story of two siblings who witness the murder of their parents in the hands of one of the drug cartels in Mexico, after this murder, Roxana Rodiles (Fernanda Castillo) the younger sister of Alejandro Ferrer (Raúl Méndez) is kidnapped. 25 years later, Alejandro Ferrer is now the captain of the Federal Police and only seeks revenge against the narcos for destroying his family. Roxana that after 25 years disappeared and ignoring that her brother is Alejandro enters a business of buying and selling diamonds. However, everything will be reduced when the interpol that silently followed the trail of money tries to capture it. After being detained and interrogated, Roxana enters the prison of Las Dunas, a boarding school with almost unique characteristics throughout Mexico, since it simultaneously houses, although in different pavilions, men and women deprived of liberty for being accused or condemned. for the most diverse crimes. Alejandro knowing this is responsible for sending Daniel Laborde (Matías Novoa), as an infiltrated agent who will try to fall in love with Roxana to obtain information, after several misunderstandings between the two siblings and without knowing they are relatives, they will try to destroy the narcos.

Season 2 (2020) 

The second season takes place two years after the first season. Roxana (Fernanda Castillo), who can no longer hide under the alias of "El Profesor", will fight to reestablish the Mil Cumbres cartel and grow her empire, but Alejandro (Raúl Méndez), commander of the Anti-Drug Unit, will not be willing to leave her now that he knows that "El Profesor" and her missing sister are the same person. These conflicts between opposing sides unleashed a war of revenge between two blood brothers, now turned into worse enemies.

Cast and characters

Main

Introduced in season 1 
 Raúl Méndez as Alejandro Ferrer (seasons 1–2)
 Fernanda Castillo as Roxana Rodiles (seasons 1–2)
 Matías Novoa as Daniel Laborde / Eduardo Tapia "El Tilapia" (season 1; guest season 2)
 Rafael Sánchez Navarro as Leopoldo Borges 
 Guillermo Quintanilla as Anselmo López "Guillotina" 
 Leonardo Daniel as Commander David Gómez (season 1; guest season 2)
 Otto Sirgo as Nemesio Rendón 
 Alejandro Speitzer as Luis Rendón "El Berebere" (season 1; guest season 2)
 Armando Hernández as Héctor Fernández "Colmillo" 
 Samadhi Zendejas as María Antonia Reyes "Mamba" 
 Valentina Acosta as Olivia Reyes 
 Itahisa Machado as Marimar Rubio 
 Elvira Monsell as Zoraida 
 Mayra Rojas as Clarisa 
 Alpha Acosta as Minerva Zambrano 
 Mar Zamora as Ochún 
 María del Carmen Félix as Ana Mercedes Calicio "La Puma" (seasons 1–2), a lesbian woman.
 Mauricio Rousselon as Robaldo Bolado "El Bowser" 
 Natalia Benvenuto as Puki 
 Alan Ciangherotti as Bernardo Rendón "El Buitre" 
 Tania Niebla as Tamara 
 Miguel René Moreno as Lieutenant Gabriel Puenzo 
 René García as Priamo Cabrales 
 Francisco Calvillo as Rafael Mantilla Moreno "El Patojo" 
 Diego Soldano as Federico Montalvo 
 Flavio Peniche as Pedro Bencomo Saldivia "Sanson" 
 Sandra Benhumea as Lula Pineda 
 Rafael Nieves as Lieutenant Carlos Muñán 
 Mónica Jiménez as Eladia Cornejo 
 Iván Aragón as Juan Romero "El Chamaco" 
 Jean Paul Leroux as Ángel Cordero 
 Roberto Uscanga as Fermín Pedraza "El Cristero" 
 Eduardo Reza as Gibrán Mendiola

Introduced in season 2 
 Aitor Luna as Martín Ustariz
 Irán Castillo as Carmen Govea
 Manuel Ojeda as Don Jesús
 Elyfer Torres as Alicia García
 Luis Alberti as Javier Rivera
 Tiago Correa as Diego Lozano
 Germán Bracco as Manuel Salas
 Amaranta Ruiz as Gladys Bernal "La Mariscala"
 Erick Chapa as Arturo Morillo
 Yuvanna Montalvo as Karla Padilla
 Arturo García Tenorio as Díaz
 Claudette Maillé as Elisa Torres
 Héctor Kotsifakis as Héctor Moreno "El Sargento"
 Ruy Senderos as Ricardo Medina
 Julio Casado as Raúl Ortega "El Habanero"
 Jorge Gallegos as Alan Rodríguez
 Luis Zahera as El Gallego
 Tony Plana as Santilla

Television ratings 
 

| link2             = #Season 2 (2020)
| episodes2         = 60
| start2            = 
| end2              = 
| startrating2      = 0.96
| endrating2        = 1.19
| viewers2          = |2}} 

}}

Episodes

Series overview

Season 1 (2018)

Season 2 (2020)

Notes

References

External links 
 

2018 telenovelas
Spanish-language American telenovelas
Telemundo telenovelas
American telenovelas
2018 American television series debuts
2018 Mexican television series debuts
Mexican telenovelas
Argos Comunicación telenovelas
2020 telenovelas
Works about Mexican drug cartels